Sultan Iskandar Muda International Airport (Indonesian: Bandar Udara Internasional Sultan Iskandar Muda, Acehnese: Bandar Udara Antar Nanggroë Sultan Iskandar Muda), also called Banda Aceh International Airport (Indonesian: Bandar Udara Internasional Banda Aceh) , is the airport located 13,5 kilometres southeast of the capital of Aceh province, Banda Aceh. It is named after the twelfth sultan of Aceh, Iskandar Muda (1583–1636). This airport was formerly called Blangbintang Airport (Indonesian: Bandara Blangbintang), referred to its location in a district with same name. This airport is listed as the 23rd busiest airport in Indonesia.

After being hit by a devastating tsunami on 26 December 2004, the airport underwent renovation and a 3000-metre runway for wide-body jet liners was built. On 9 October 2011 the first Boeing 747-400 landed and took off successfully at the airport. This airport can act as a place of refugee in case of natural disasters, such as tsunami. The airport was also used as a staging ground for international emergency aid in response to the tsunami in Aceh.

Sultan Iskandar Muda International Airport got World's Best Airport for Halal Travellers in the World Halal Tourism Awards 2016.

History
Sultan Iskandar Muda Airport was built by the Japanese Government in 1943. At that time, the airport had a runway 1400 metres long and 30 metres wide in the form of the letter T from the South end lengthwise from east to west.

In 1953 the Sultan Iskandar Muda Airport (at that time called Blang Bintang Airport) was reopened by the Government of the Republic of Indonesia for the purpose of landing the plane. Runway used only runway stretching from South to North 1400 metres in length. The first plane to land after reopening was a DC-3 Dakota, and a few years later, the Convair 240.

In 1968, the airport has developed a runway extension to 1850 meters with a width of 45 metres, and an apron of 90 x 120 metres, so it could accommodate larger aircraft such as the Fokker F28.

In 1993 and 1994 the Sultan Iskandar Muda Airport re-experience the developments related to the National MTQ be held in Banda Aceh, with a 2250 runway extension x 45 metres, which can accommodate aircraft DC-9 and B-737 and supported with the installation of a Radar which is located at Mount Linteung within approximately 14 km from the airport.

On 9 April 1994 the Sultan Iskandar Muda Airport join the PT (Persero) Angkasa Pura II, based on the letter of the Minister of Finance No. 533/MK.016/1994 and the Minister of Transportation letter A. 278/AU.002/SKJ/1994.

The proposed change of name of the Blang Bintang Airport to Sultan Iskandar Muda Airport is:
 Letter legislatures Aceh Special Region No. 553.2/661 dated April 4, 1995
 Letter of Governor of Aceh Special Region No. 553.2/8424 dated 11 April 1995
 Decree of the Minister of Transportation No. 20 of 1995 dated May 11, 1995 about the name change of Blang Bintang Airport to be Sultan Iskandar Muda Airport.

In 1999, Sultan Iskandar Muda Airport resume development by adding a 2500 metre long runway to be able to accommodate the A330 aircraft, in order to serve the hajj pilgrims departure in connection with the election of Sultan Iskandar Muda Airport as one of the embarkation/disembarkation hajj pilgrimage.

On 19 May 2003, 458 Indonesian paratroopers landed near the airport as part of an offensive against Acehnese rebels.

Recent development of this airport was in 2009 where the length of the runway again increased to 3000 metres with a width of 45 meters, the new terminal building replaces the old terminal building. This airport was inaugurated officially by the President of the Republic of Indonesia, Susilo Bambang Yudhoyono on August 20, 2009, when President Susilo Bambang Yudhoyono came to Aceh officially to open the fifth annual Aceh Cultural Week (Pekan Kebudayaan Aceh).

Airlines and destinations
The following destinations are served from the airport:

Passenger

Parking facilities
 Cars: 200
 Motorcycles: 250
 Buses: 6
 Taxis: 25

Traffic and statistics

Accidents and incidents
 On 4 April 1987, Garuda Indonesia Flight 035 en route from Banda Aceh to Medan, crashed during approach at Polonia International Airport. 23 of 45 passengers and crew were killed.
 On 31 January 1993, a Shorts SC.7 Skyvan 3-100 of Pan-Malaysian Air Transport, a non-scheduled domestic flight from Medan to Banda Aceh crashed into Mount Kapur because bad weather. All 14 passengers and crew were killed.
 On 4 January 2005, a Boeing 737-200C of Tri-MG Intra Asia Airlines was part of the relief operation to the tsunami stricken area of Banda Aceh. As the aircraft landed in Banda Aceh during the night, it struck a water buffalo that had entered the runway. The main gear on the port side collapsed, causing damage to the gear and port engine. There were no injuries and the aircraft was declared a write off and scrapped several months later.
 On 21 July 2005, just seven months and 17 days after the accident, a CN-235 of Indonesian Air Force en route from Banda Aceh to Lhokseumawe crashed during approach at Malikus Saleh Airport. 3 of 23 passengers and crew were killed.
 On 18 April 2006, a PZL M28 Skytruck owned by Kepolisian Republik Indonesia experienced a tire burst on landing at the airport. There were no fatalities in this incident, but several flights at the airport were delayed up to three hours.
 On 7 September 2012, a Boeing 737-900ER owned by Lion Air flight number JT 305 Banda Aceh-Medan route failed to take off twice due to irregularities security system. However, at 18:00 pm the plane finally took off and flew to Medan, North Sumatra. The number of passengers on board was originally 210 passengers including the former governor of Aceh, Irwandi Yusuf but 39 of them cancel flights.

Notes

References

External links

 Sultan Iskandar Muda International Airport - Indonesia Airport Global Website
 http://www.sultaniskandarmuda-airport.co.id
 http://www.angkasapura2.co.id
 
 

Airports in Aceh